Diego Olsina (born April 22, 1978) is a former professional Argentine footballer who last played for UAT.

External links

1978 births
Living people
Argentine footballers
Mexican footballers
Liga MX players
Tiro Federal footballers
Central Córdoba de Rosario footballers
Club Tijuana footballers
Dorados de Sinaloa footballers
C.F. Mérida footballers
Irapuato F.C. footballers
Correcaminos UAT footballers
Argentine expatriate footballers
Expatriate footballers in Mexico
Place of birth missing (living people)

Association footballers not categorized by position